Anastasios Tsikaris (born 28 September 1966) is a Greek former water polo player who competed in the 1988 Summer Olympics, where the Greek water polo team finished in ninth place.

References

1966 births
Living people
Greek male water polo players
Olympic water polo players of Greece
Water polo players at the 1988 Summer Olympics
Place of birth missing (living people)

Ethnikos Piraeus Water Polo Club players